Glenn Olof Rönnberg is a Swedish former footballer who played as a left-back, midfielder and a forward, starting his career at AIK Fotboll. He is the brother of fellow footballer Mikael Rönnberg.

References

1961 births
Living people
Swedish footballers
Allsvenskan players
AIK Fotboll players
Footballers from Stockholm
Association football midfielders